Glenmore is a district (kecamatan) of Banyuwangi Regency, East Java province, Indonesia. It is named after a plantation located nearby which once owned by an Englishman named Ros Taylor since 1910.

Glenmore is a Scottish name. The name may lend support to the report of the existence of Scottish settlement since 18th century in the area, established by Catholic Scots originally seeking refuge in Holland, but later sent to Dutch East Indies.

The Pura Pucak Raung, a Javanese Hindu temple, is located in Glenmore. It is within the vicinity of the temple that Balinese literature locates the place where the Hindu saint Maharishi Markandeya gathered followers for an expedition to Bali, whereby he is said to have brought Hinduism to the island in the fifth century AD.

Villages 
Glenmore has 7 villages:
 Bumiharjo
 Karangharjo
 Margomulyo
 Sepanjang
 Sumbergondo
 Tegalharjo
 Tulungrejo

References

Banyuwangi Regency
Districts of East Java